The 1984 Mid-Eastern Athletic Conference men's basketball tournament took place March 8–10, 1984 at Greensboro Coliseum in Greensboro, North Carolina. North Carolina A&T defeated , 65–58 in the championship game, to win its third consecutive MEAC Tournament title.

The Aggies earned an automatic bid to the 1984 NCAA tournament as a No. 12 seed in the Mideast region.

Format
Six of seven conference members participated, with play beginning in the quarterfinal round. Teams were seeded based on their regular season conference record.

Bracket

* denotes overtime period

References

MEAC men's basketball tournament
1983–84 Mid-Eastern Athletic Conference men's basketball season
MEAC men's basketball tournament